David Edmund Kuhl (October 27, 1929 in St. Louis, Missouri – May 28, 2017 in Ann Arbor, Michigan) was
an American scientist specializing in nuclear medicine.
He was well known for his pioneering work in positron emission tomography. Dr. Kuhl served as the Chief of the Division of Nuclear Medicine at the University of Michigan for 20 years and retired in June 2011.

Education and career
He obtained M.D.from University of Pennsylvania School of Medicine in 1955 and then completed his residency at Hospital of the University of Pennsylvania in 1962. During his time at Penn he developed a new method of tomographic imaging and constructed several tomographic instruments. These tomographic imaging techniques he invented were further developed in the 1970s and now called positron emission tomography or PET.

He joined the University of Michigan Medical School faculty in 1986 and worked to develop the use of FDG metabolism scanning in human brains. During his time as Chief of the Division of Nuclear Medicine and Director of the Center for Positron Emission Tomography, the University of Michigan became one of the first US institutions to offer clinical diagnostic PET services.

His discoveries and clinical translations helped lead to the routine clinical use of PET in neurology, cardiology and oncology in the US and worldwide.

Honors 
 1976 Nuclear Pioneer (awarded by the Society of Nuclear Medicine)
 1981 Ernst Jung Prize
 2001 Kettering Prize
 2009 Japan Prize

References

External links
 Profile at University of Michigan Health System
  (Japan Prize)
 Professorship at the University of Michigan Medical School Department of Radiology

2017 deaths
1929 births
Perelman School of Medicine at the University of Pennsylvania alumni
University of Michigan faculty
American radiologists
American nuclear medicine physicians
Members of the National Academy of Medicine